Crassula moschata, commonly known as the Shore Stonecrop, Musky Stonecrop,  or Musky Crassula, is a hairless, mat-forming, succulent, perennial herb.  It is widespread on the subantarctic and cool temperate shores of the Southern Ocean.

Description
The main stems grow along the ground, rooting at the nodes. The lateral stems are erect.  The small spoon to lance-shaped leaves are reddish at the base with the upper leaves concave and the lower convex; they are 2.8–4.2 mm long and 1.1–1.5 mm wide. The single flowers appear in the axils of the upper leaves; they appear from January to March: they have pink sepals and white petals about 2.5 mm long.  The fruits have four seeds, each about 0.8 mm long and roughly oval in shape.

Distribution and habitat
The species has a circumpolar range in subantarctic latitudes where it is found in southern South America, Tasmania, New Zealand and many subantarctic islands.  It occurs in the littoral zone on beachrock stacks, on humic sandy soils on rocky shores, and on thin peaty soil on beach pebbles.

References

moschata
Flora of the Falkland Islands
Flora of the Prince Edward Islands
Flora of the Crozet Islands
Flora of the Kerguelen Islands
Flora of the Chatham Islands
Flora of the Antipodes Islands
Flora of the Auckland Islands
Flora of the Campbell Islands
Flora of Macquarie Island
Flora of New Zealand
Flora of Tasmania
Plants described in 1787